George Neville Brownrigg (16 July 1896 – 20 January 1981) was an Irish first-class cricketer.  Brownrigg's batting style is unknown, while it is known he was a left-arm bowler, his exact bowling style is unknown. He was born at Durrow, Ireland.

Brownrigg made his first-class debut for Sussex against Oxford University in 1921.  The following season he made two further first-class appearances in the 1922 County Championship against Warwickshire and Nottinghamshire.  In his three first-class matches for Sussex, Brownrigg took 4 wickets at an average of 25.75, with best figures of 4/31.  With the bat, he scored just 26 runs at a batting average of 8.66, with a high score of 11.

He died at Westminster, London on 20 January 1981.

References

External links
George Brownrigg at ESPNcricinfo
George Brownrigg at CricketArchive

1896 births
1981 deaths
Sportspeople from County Laois
English people of Irish descent
Irish cricketers
Sussex cricketers
English cricketers